Carlos Andrés Alfaro Alcántara (born May 29, 1991) is a Chilean former football goalkeeper.

Career
He joined Coquimbo Unido youth team on 2004, where he played until 2010 before being promoted to the first team, debuting and playing 8 games on the tournament. On 2011 he joined Universidad de Chile, just before the 2011 South American U-20. On 2 December 2012 he debuted with Universidad de Chile in a match for the Copa Chile against Universidad de Concepción.

He pulled out from the football activity at the age of 28, when he played for Deportes Copiapó at the Chilean Primera B. After, he went to Barcelona to get a Master's degree in Sport Management at the Johan Cruyff Institute. Since then, he has practiced as Manager of International Relations of C.D. Montcada.

Honours

Club
Universidad de Chile
 Primera División de Chile (3): 2011 Apertura, 2011 Clausura, 2012 Apertura
 Copa Sudamericana (1): 2011
 Copa Chile (1): 2012–13

References

External links
 
 Carlos Alfaro Alcántara

1991 births
Living people
People from Coquimbo
People from Elqui Province
Chilean footballers
Chile youth international footballers
Chilean Primera División players
Primera B de Chile players
Coquimbo Unido footballers
Universidad de Chile footballers
Deportes Copiapó footballers
Malleco Unido footballers
Unión San Felipe footballers
Ñublense footballers
National Premier Soccer League players
Association football goalkeepers